RTV Palma (palm tree) was a privately owned Serbian television station based in Belgrade.

History
TV Palma was owned by Palma Ltd, a company set up in October 1991 by Belgrade-based lawyer Miodrag Miki Vujović. On 18 March 1993, TV Palma was launched as Belgrade's sixth TV station. Initially, it broadcast on the 39th channel from 17:00 to 02:00, and was one of the first TV stations in Serbia to play hardcore pornography (starting at a quarter to 01:00). The adult segment was later moved to 02:00, but the decision was reversed after public outcry.

Vujović had already been running another TV station on the 34th channel, MV Channel Real Times, from 9 January 1992. The channel broadcast mainly business news and satellite reruns (MTV, Eurosport, The Children's Channel) and was sponsored by Jugoskandik, a fraudulent bank run by Jezdimir Vasiljević, Vujović's groomsman (kum). MV Channel Real Times was initially broadcast from the premises of Borba, a newspaper closely aligned with the ruling Socialist Party of Serbia. Also, TV Palma's headquarters was initially located on the premises of the SPS near Tašmajdan. Vujović had been renting the office from the party, of which he was also a member. For this reason, it was widely speculated that both TV stations were ideologically closely aligned with the socialists, which was denied by Vujović. By the end of 1993, TV Palma had started broadcasting on the 34th channel, leaving only the graveyard slot reserved for the MV Channel Real Times, which was eventually cancelled altogether.

In 1995, TV Palma tried to transfer to the 12th channel, challenging BK Telecom. The two stations went to court in late August 1995. In October 1995, the government officially granted the 12th channel to BK Telecom.

On 10 February 1997 Miki Vujović and Dragoljub Milanović, general director of RTS, signed a deal stating that the two TV stations would work on the conception and realization of a unified program. Similar deals were signed around that time by other stations, as it allowed them to bypass a public bidding for the bandwidth by aligning their programming with the RTS.

Following the renovation of the Magistrate in Zemun, the Serbian Radical Party, having signed a lease to the building for 30 years on 4 December 1998, signed a sublease to TV Palma. This was considered controversial as the SRS was part of the local government in Zemun at the time, and also subleasing was illegal. In May 2000 Vujović responded to accusations that the station was biased toward the SRS saying that any opposition party could pay for a show such as Radikalski talasi, and would be charged half the price.

During the overthrow of Slobodan Milošević on 5 October 2000 TV Palma stopped broadcasting at around 19:05, broadcasting only the message "We cannot continue broadcasting while the city is in flames". The first guest following the overthrow was Dragoljub Mićunović.

Following investigations by the new local government in Zemun, in June 2001 Federal Minister of Telecommunications Boris Tadić came out with information that three television networks that were "more than close to the SPS" - TV Pink, BK Telecom and TV Palma owed 2,1 million DM in total.

In April 2006 TV Palma and several other TV stations applied for broadcasting rights on the territory of Belgrade. Four NGOs, including the Youth Initiative for Human Rights, put out a statement saying that the council making the decision was "seeming to lose sight of its legal powers and boundaries, manifesting a lack of tolerance and was, akin to earlier ideological commissions, not hiding its intolerance towards media outlets whose editorial policy they did not like".

In July 2006 the Republic Broadcasting Agency decided that only TV Most, held by SPS member Dušan Bajatović, and TV Palma were denied broadcasting rights. The Democratic Party supported this decision stating that both stations were responsible for hate speech and anti-democratic propaganda during the SPS government. The same month, the Law on Broadcasting was amended giving the RBA the power to seize any frequency that wasn't awarded to a TV station.

On 26 December 2006 coercive measures were taken by the Republic Broadcasting Agency to prohibit the broadcasting of TV Palma.

During the first half of 2007, and for a short period in May 2008, TV Palma broadcast via satellite.

On 14 July 2007 TV Palma started illegally transmitting from its old transmitter in Zemun on the 36th channel, causing distortions to TV Enter, the station occupying that frequency at the time. Authorities took action and stopped the transmission on 18 July 2007 on the count of piracy.

In March 2009 Palma Ltd took the Republic Broadcasting Agency to court over the fact that the Council of the RBA did not have the legal capacity to prohibit the broadcasting of a TV station, a task normally deferred to Republic Telecommunications Agency. On 4 June 2009 the Supreme Court of Serbia ruled in favor of Palma Ltd. The RBA was forced to reexamine the request from July 2006 and, despite earlier indications, reiterated their earlier decision on 25 January 2010. TV Palma had been broadcasting during this period, starting in December 2009. Vujović even announced he had been planning on a fresh start with a new slogan - "Srpska, a svetska" ("Serbian, yet world-class").

Starting in late September 2011 TV Palma broadcast via cable (Kopernikus for Belgrade proper, and Avcom for Borča and Krnjača). Its license was revoked on 8 January 2013 as a result of its large accumulated debt.

Programming
Early on, TV Palma's program consisted mainly of turbo folk music videos. However, after the launch of TV Pink, Palma found it hard to compete and started broadcasting pirated films and satellite TV programs, as well as telenovelas.

Already in 1994, TV Palma started sporadically broadcasting a number of US TV series including Dallas, Dynasty, The Colbys, Barnaby Jones, Remington Steele, The Flying Nun, The Big Valley, Cagney & Lacey, Tales of the Unexpected, Charlie's Angels, M*A*S*H, The Trials of Rosie O'Neill, The Young and Restless, Days of Our Lives and I'll Take Manhattan. Later, Palma broadcast a few US teen TV series including Dead at 21 and Kenan & Kel.

By late 1998, TV Palma shifted its focus to broadcasting a number of political and art shows. Around the turn of 1999, the late-night adult program was cancelled.

On 12 December 2000 TV Palma broadcast the first and only interview with Slobodan Milošević following his overthrow. This was condemned by several MPs from the Democratic Opposition of Serbia including Nebojša Čović.

In late 2001 TV Palma canceled all its political shows and started to orient itself to more commercial content. Talk show host Olivera Miletović confirmed in an interview for Ekspres in May 2001 that this was a precondition set by the US before Palma could be allowed to broadcast via satellite.

Political shows
 Dijalog (Dialogue), a talk show featuring monologues and one-on-one interviews, hosted by Miki Vujović
 Obračun pod Palmom (Clash under the Palm Tree), a talk show featuring a panel of guests, hosted by Miki Vujović
 Radikalski talasi (Radical Waves), a Serbian Radical Party propaganda show edited by Aleksandar Vučić and hosted by Ksenija Vučić
 Pitanja i odgovori (Questions and Answers), usually one-on-one interviews, hosted by Olivera Miletović, the show later switched to TV Palma Plus
 Mon Blan (Mont Blanc), a conspiracy theory show hosted by Third Position artist Dragoš Kalajić
 H2O, a talk show hosted by Blažo Popović
 Kompromis (Compromise), a talk show hosted by Marko Janković, who transferred from Studio B in 2001 following a controversial episode

Cultural, religious and entertainment shows
 Subotom na Palmi (Saturdays at Palma), a cultural show promoting the Faculty of Dramatic Arts at the University of Belgrade, edited and hosted by Maja Volk, switched to ART TV in 2000
 Čudesa stvaranja (The Miracles of Creation), a creationist show hosted by Miroljub Petrović
 Približavanje Hilandaru (Approaching Hilandar), a cultural show about the Hilandar Monastery hosted by Dušan Milovanović, Milutin Stanković and Dragan Tanasijević
 S blagoslovom u Treći Milenijum (With Blessings, into the Third Millennium), an Orthodox Christian show hosted by Dušan Milovanović and Milutin Stanković
 Minimaksovizija (Minimaks-o-vision), a daytime talk show hosted by Milovan Ilić Minimaks, transferred from TV Pink in 2000 following a dispute with the owner
 Nešto obično, nešto lično (Something Ordinary, Something Personal), a daytime talk show hosted by Lidija Manić
 Peta brzina (Fifth Gear), a motor sports show hosted by race car driver Peca Dobrohotov
 Putna torba (Travel Bag), a travel show hosted by Ivan Krivec
 011 (the name refers to the calling code for Belgrade), a news show covering local politics and cultural events in Belgrade hosted by Aleksandar Ćirić
 Oaza (The Oasis), a nature documentary series filmed in Serbia, hosted by Gordana Andrić
 Visoke potpetice (High Heels), a fashion show hosted by Ivana Rajković
 Vitalis, an alternative medicine show hosted by Vesna Marinković Mičić

Telenovelas
 Čipke (Lace) — 1994-1996
 I bogati plaču (Los ricos también lloran) — 1995-1997
 Sebične majke (Madres egoístas) — 1996-1997
 S one strane mosta (Más allá del puente) — 1996
 Zabranjena ljubav (Sentimientos Ajenos) — 1996-1998
 Gušterov osmeh (O Sorriso do Lagarto) — after 1996
 Ljubavne veze (Lazos de Amor) — 1997-1999
 Krivica (The Guilt (1996)) — 1997-1998
 Mali grad Infijerno (Pueblo chico, infierno grande) — 1998-1999
 Antonela (Antonella) — after 2000
 Suze i ljubav (Yo amo a Paquita Gallego) — 2001
 Sve za ljubav (Aunque me Cueste la Vida) — 2001
 Plima ljubavi (Marea brava (1999)) — 2002

In popular culture
In December 2015 Serbian hip hop artist Mimi Mercedez released a music video for her single Suši (sushi). The logo of TV Palma was featured prominently, and the image was distorted to resemble turbo folk music videos as an homage to 1990s pop culture in Serbia.

References

External links

Television stations in Serbia
Music television channels
Mass media in Belgrade
Defunct mass media in Serbia
Music organizations based in Serbia
Television channels and stations established in 1993 
Television channels and stations disestablished in 2006